Clio Hinton Bracken (1870–1925) was an American sculptor.

A native of Rhinebeck, New York, Bracken studied with Augustus Saint-Gaudens. 

Her mother was a painter and sculptor, and she shared studio space with her cousin, Roland Hinton Perry.

She was known for her portraits, including those of such figures as John J. Pershing, John C. Frémont, Henri Farré, and Gabriele d'Annunzio.

Her studio was located in the Greenwich Village neighborhood of the Manhattan borough of New York City, New York.

A statue of Chloe is in the collection of Brookgreen Gardens, 
a sculpture garden and wildlife preserve 
in South Carolina.

References

1870 births
1925 deaths
20th-century American sculptors
20th-century American women artists
American portrait artists
American women sculptors
Artists from New York City
People from Greenwich Village
People from Rhinebeck, New York
Sculptors from New York (state)